The Kalin Twins (born February 16, 1934), also known as Hal and Herbie, were an American pop singing, songwriting and recording duo, formed in 1958 by twin brothers Harold Kalin and Herbert Kalin. The duo is best remembered for their number one 1958 hit "When".

Career 
The twins were born in Port Jervis, New York, but the family later moved to Washington, D.C. Originally discovered by Clint Ballard Jr., the writer of many hit records such as "Good Timin'" for Jimmy Jones, and "I'm Alive" for The Hollies, the sibling duo had a couple of early recording flops.
However, in 1958, after searching through piles of writers' demo tapes, their management discovered the song called "When", written by Paul Evans and Jack Reardon. It topped the UK Singles Chart on September 13, 1958, got to Number 5 in their U.S. homeland, and sold over two million copies in the process. The track remained in the UK listings for eighteen weeks, five of which were at Number One. They had no further UK chart entries.

The Kalins were the first set of twins to reach number one in the UK as a duo, followed years later by The Proclaimers. They were supported by Cliff Richard on their only UK tour. Their second single, "Forget Me Not", reached Number 12 in the US Billboard chart later in 1958. After two further low-ranking entries in 1959, they never reached the charts again.

Post-music career 
Eventually, disillusioned with diminishing returns, the brothers returned to their day jobs, with each pursuing college degrees. They did not perform again until 1977, when a mutual friend booked them to appear at his new nightclub. Sometimes they performed with their younger sibling, Jack, and thus appeared as the Kalin Brothers.

They disappeared again as a performing act, until 1989. Then, their one-time support act, Cliff Richard, invited them to play at his Wembley Stadium 'The Event' concerts, as part of a sequence paying homage to the 1950s television pop show, Oh Boy!

Personal lives and deaths 
Herbert Kalin was married and had four children, Suzan Lynn, Kelly Lee, Buddy Ladd, and Jonathan Ray.

Harold "Hal" Kalin died on August 24, 2005, as a result of injuries sustained in an automobile accident, aged 71. Herbert "Herbie" Kalin died July 21, 2006, from a heart attack, aged 72.

Discography 
"Jumpin' Jack" b/w "Walkin' To School" — (1958) — each charted in the US publication Music Vendor, Feb-March 1958 — Decca Records
"Three O'Clock Thrill" b/w "When" — (1958) — U.S. jukebox favorite, Decca Records
"When" b/w "Three O'Clock Thrill" — (1958) — U.S. #5 Decca Records — UK #1 Brunswick Records - Canada #2 Decca Records
"Forget Me Not" b/w "Dream of Me" — (1958) — U.S. #12 — Decca Records - Canada #12 — Decca Records
"It's Only the Beginning" b/w "Oh! My Goodness" — (1959) — U.S. #42 
"When I Look in the Mirror" b/w "Cool" — (1959)
"Sweet Sugar Lips" b/w "Moody" — (1959) — U.S. #97 
"Why Don't You Believe Me" b/w "The Meaning of the Blues" — (1959)
"Chicken Thief" b/w "Loneliness" — (1960)
"Blue, Blue Town" b/w "True to You" — (1960)
"Zing! Went the Strings of My Heart" b/w "No Money Can Buy" — (1960)
"Momma-Poppa" b/w "You Mean the World To Me" — (1961)
"Bubbles (I'm Forever Blowing Bubbles)" b/w "One More Time" — (1961)
"A Picture of You" b/w "Trouble" — (1962)
"Sometimes It Comes, Sometimes It Goes" b/w "Thinkin' About You Baby" — (1966) — Amy Records
"Silver Seagull" — (1978)
"American Eagle" b/w "When (Disco Version)" — (1979) — Octember Records

References

External links 
"When" Lyrics Website

American country music groups
Decca Records artists
Twin musical duos
American musical duos
Singers from New York (state)
People from Port Jervis, New York
Singers from Washington, D.C.
American twins
20th-century American male singers
20th-century American singers
Songwriters from New York (state)
Male musical duos